Peter Harckham (born September 16, 1960) is an American businessman and politician from the State of New York. A Democrat, Harckham represents Senate District 40 in the New York State Senate. He was first elected in 2018, defeating incumbent Terrence Murphy. The 40th district includes parts of Dutchess, Putnam and Westchester counties in the Hudson Valley.

Before serving in the Senate, Harckham was a member of the Westchester County Board of Legislators and served in the administration of Andrew Cuomo.

Background 
Harckham grew up in the Hudson Valley, residing in Rockland County for most of his childhood. He attended Clarkstown High School North, before attending Dickinson College, where he graduated in English.

Harckham began his career in the advertising sector, working on Madison Avenue in the 1980s. Today he continues to work in media and advertising, and owns his own business based in the Hudson Valley.

Prior to elected office, Harckham served as President for a not for profit housing corporation that builds affordable housing in northern Westchester County.  Prior to that, Harckham served as Vice Chair of the Clarence E. Heller Charitable Foundation, a San Francisco-based private foundation that supports the sustainable management of natural resources.

In 2007, Harckham was first elected to the Westchester County Board of Legislators, winning again in 2009, 2011, and 2013. He ran unsuccessfully for the New York State Assembly in a 2010 special election. He served for four terms as a county legislator, including two terms as Democratic Majority Leader.

In 2012 he was a pledged elector for president Barack Obama in the electoral college. In 2015 he left the legislature to work in the administration of New York Governor Andrew Cuomo as assistant director of the Office of Community Renewal. In that position he helped administer grants in the lower Hudson Valley.

New York Senate 
In 2018, Harckham was recruited to run against incumbent Republican state Senator Terrence Murphy. Murphy had represented Senate District 40 since 2015. While the district was competitive, Murphy was believed to be a formidable candidate who was less vulnerable than some of his GOP colleagues. However, in an overwhelmingly Democratic election year, Harckham defeated Murphy, 51% to 49%.

Harckham was sworn in on January 1, 2019, by Governor Andrew Cuomo. In the Senate, he is serving as Chair of the Committee on Alcoholism and Substance Abuse.

Harckham was reelected to the Senate in 2020 in a race against former Westchester County Executive Rob Astorino. Astorino conceded three weeks after election day. The count was delayed due to an increase in mail-in voting due to the COVID-19 pandemic as well as a lawsuit filed by Astorino prior to election day challenging the security of the election.

Harckham serves as Chairman of the Committee on Alcoholism and Substance Abuse and co-chair of the Joint Senate Task Force on Opioids, Addiction & Overdose Prevention. He is also a member of the Domestic Animal Welfare; Labor; Energy and Telecommunications; Local Government; Environmental Conservation; and Veterans, Homeland Security and Military Affairs committees.

Electoral history

Westchester County Legislature

New York State Assembly

New York State Senate

External links
Harckham's campaign site

Notes

Living people
New York (state) Democrats
People from Westchester County, New York
Politicians from Westchester County, New York
21st-century American politicians
Legislators from Westchester County, New York
1960 births